Sakar Şakir is a 1977 Turkish comedy film directed by Natuk Baytan.

Cast 
 Kemal Sunal - Sakir
 Adile Naşit - Fatma Sen
 Ali Şen - Haci Sen
 Ünal Gürel - Gardrop Fuat
  - Sevda
  - Lufer
  - Sukru
 Kamer Sadik - Sabri

References

External links 

1977 comedy films
Turkish comedy films
1977 films
1970s Turkish-language films